Reports on Progress in Physics is a monthly peer-reviewed scientific journal published by IOP Publishing. The editor-in-chief as of 2022 is Subir Sachdev (Harvard University).

Scope
The focus of this journal is invited review articles covering all branches of physics. Each review will typically survey and critique a particular topic, or developments in a field. Introductions of articles are intended for a broad readership, beyond the specialist or expert. In addition to the traditional review article two other formats are available: Reports on Progress (about 20 pages) and Key Issues Reviews (about 10 pages).

Abstracting and indexing
Reports on Progress in Physics is abstracted and indexed in the following databases:

References

External links
 

IOP Publishing academic journals
Physics review journals
Publications established in 1934
Monthly journals
English-language journals